Hubert Hurkacz and John Isner defeated Wesley Koolhof and Neal Skupski in the final, 7–6(7–5), 6–4 to win the men's doubles title at the 2022 Miami Open. Isner completed the Sunshine Double, having won the title at Indian Wells alongside Jack Sock. He became the first player to achieve the Sunshine Double in men's doubles since Pierre-Hugues Herbert and Nicolas Mahut in 2016. 

Nikola Mektić and Mate Pavić were the defending champions, but lost in the second round to Rohan Bopanna and Denis Shapovalov.

Pavić and Joe Salisbury were in contention for the ATP No. 1 doubles ranking. Salisbury became the new world No. 1, after Pavić lost in the second round.

Seeds

Draw

Finals

Top half

Bottom half

Seeded teams
The following are the seeded teams, based on ATP rankings as of March 21, 2022.

Other entry information

Wildcards

Alternates
  Marin Čilić /  Łukasz Kubot

Protected ranking
  Austin Krajicek /  Édouard Roger-Vasselin

Withdrawals 
  Ilya Ivashka /  Karen Khachanov → replaced by  Karen Khachanov /  Andrey Rublev
  Reilly Opelka /  Jannik Sinner → replaced by  Marin Čilić /  Łukasz Kubot
  Tim Pütz /  Michael Venus → replaced by  Lloyd Glasspool /  Michael Venus

References

External links
Main draw

2022 ATP Tour
Doubles men